Erkki Aarno Mallenius (12 January 1928 – 2 July 2003) was a Finnish amateur boxer who won a bronze medal in the light welterweight division at the 1952 Olympics.

Mallenius took up boxing in 1945 and in 1946 won the Finnish junior lightweight title. He never held a senior national title, and qualified to the Helsinki Olympics by winning the 1952 Olympic trials. At the Olympics he won his first two bouts, but broke a carpal bone in a hand in the second one, and hence withdrew from the semifinal and retired from boxing. He then worked as a boxing coach and a building contractor. In 2008 he was inducted into the Finnish Boxing Hall of Fame.

References

1928 births
2003 deaths
People from Lappeenranta
Boxers at the 1952 Summer Olympics
Olympic boxers of Finland
Olympic bronze medalists for Finland
Olympic medalists in boxing
Finnish male boxers
Medalists at the 1952 Summer Olympics
Light-welterweight boxers
Sportspeople from South Karelia